The Women's 800-metre freestyle competition at the 2019 World Championships was held on 26 and 27 July 2019. Defending champion Katie Ledecky successfully defended her title in 8:13.58 with a final lap comeback against Italy's Simona Quadarella.

Records
Prior to the competition, the existing world and championship records were as follows.

Results

Heats
The heats were started on 26 July at 12:05.

Final
The final was started on 27 July at 21:25.

References

Women's 800 metre freestyle
2019 in women's swimming